FC Chanthabouly, previously known as Lao Toyota F.C. for sponsorship reasons, is a professional football club based in Vientiane, Laos, competing in the Lao League 1.

History

FC Chanthabouly was founded in 2013 as Lao Toyota F.C. by Toyota. The team debuted in the Vientiane Capital League 1 in 2013, where they finished third and earned promotion to the Lao Premier League. In 2015, the team won its first domestic championship. This was followed by four successive championship victories between 2017 and 2020. 

Since 2015, the team has qualified every season for the AFC Cup. The best result the team has achieved in this competition is fourth place in the group stage.

In 2021, the team adopted its current name, F.C. Chanthabouly.

Domestic history

Continental history

Current squad

 (captain)

Honours

Domestic leagues
 Lao Premier League:
 Champion (5): 2015, 2017, 2018, 2019, 2020
 Runners-up (2): 2014, 2016
 Lao FF Cup:
 Champion (1): 2019
 Runners-up (2): 2014

Sponsors

Technical staff

Manager history
Coaches by Years (2013–2020)

  Somsack Keodala 
  Dave Booth 
  Bounlap Khenkitisack 
  Valakone Phomphakdy (Interim caretaker for the AFC Cup)  
  Jun Fukuda 
  Prajak Weangsong

Affiliated clubs
  Shonan Bellmare (2022–present)

References

External links
 Lao football

Football clubs in Laos
Association football clubs established in 2013
Works association football teams